Michail Vladimirovich Jurowski (25 December 1945 – 19 March 2022) was a Russian conductor who worked internationally, based in Germany for most of his career. He was particularly interested in the works of Dmitri Shostakovich, in concerts and recordings.

Jurowski grew up in a musical family, where his father Vladimir Mikhailovich Yurovsky was a composer, and many prominent Russian musicians were family friends. He first worked in Moscow, but was from 1978 a regular guest conductor at the Komische Oper Berlin, then in East Berlin. With a 1989 contract for the Staatsoper Dresden, he moved to Germany with his family. He was music director of the Nordwestdeutsche Philharmonie from 1992, and the Norddeutsche Philharmonie Rostock from 1999, followed by positions with the Berlin Radio Symphony Orchestra and the WDR Rundfunkorchester Köln. He worked as a guest worldwide, including Scandinavia and Argentina.

His recordings include the first recordings of Dmitri Shostakovich's unfinished opera The Gamblers after Nikolai Gogol, completed by Krzysztof Meyer in 1981, and of Anton Rubinstein's Moses. He was instrumental in founding the International Shostakovich Days in Gohrisch. His sons Vladmimir and Dmitri are also conductors.

Life and career

Moscow 
Jurowski was born in Moscow, the son of composer Vladimir Michailovich Jurowski. Shostakovitch was a friend of the family, and as a boy, he played four-hand piano music with him. Other friends of the Jewish family were Aram Khachaturian, Mikhail Romm, David Oistrach, Mstislav Rostropovich, Emil Gilels and Leonid Kogan. Jurowski studied at the Moscow Conservatory with Leo Ginzburg and Alexey Kandinsky. He felt antisemitic tendencies already when studying. He later worked at the Stanislavski Theatre and the Bolshoi Theatre in Moscow. Jurowski was assistant to Gennady Rozhdestvensky at the Moscow Radio Symphony Orchestra. His positions were not adequate to his talent, due to the antisemitism of the time.

East Germany 
From 1978, he was a regular guest conductor at the Komische Oper Berlin, then in East Berlin, and from 1988 also at the Staatsoper Dresden. He received increasing commissions from European countries. In 1989, he was offered a permanent position in Dresden, and moved to Germany in 1990. From 1992 to 1998, Jurowski was music director and principal conductor of the Nordwestdeutsche Philharmonie based in Herford. He conducted in 1995 the premiere recording of Dmitri Shostakovich's unfinished opera The Gamblers after Nikolai Gogol, completed by Krzysztof Meyer in 1981, sung in Russian by soloists of the Bolshoi Theatre, with the Nordwestdeutsche Philharmonie. From 1997, he served as Intendant of the Volkstheater Rostock as well as the Norddeutsche Philharmonie Rostock. In the 1990s, he worked in Berlin, where he settled, at all three opera houses, with the Deutsches Symphonie-Orchester Berlin and Rundfunk-Sinfonieorchester Berlin, as regular conductor from 1998 to 2006. He was first guest conductor for the Tonkünstler Orchestra in Lower Austria.

International 
Jurowski was active in Europe, including Moscow again and La Scala in Milan, and beyond, such as with the Buenos Aires Philharmonic in the Teatro Colón. In Scandinavia, he was close with the Norrköping Symphony Orchestra, and conducted the Bergen Philharmonic, and in Malmö, Odense and Copenhagen. He conducted at the Oper Frankfurt, at the Paris Opéra, and the London Philharmonic Orchestra and Saint Petersburg Philharmonic Orchestra, among other. From 1999 to 2001, he was principal conductor of the Leipzig Opera, and from 2006 to 2008 principal director of the WDR Rundfunkorchester Köln. He conducted Prokofiev's The Fiery Angel at the Bavarian State Opera in 2017. He conducted the first performance and recording of Anton Rubinstein's opera Moses with the Polish Sinfonia Iuventus Orchestra in Warsaw in 2017. Jurowski was instrumental in founding the International Shostakovich Days in Gohrisch in 2010.

Personal life 
Jurowski and his wife Eleonora Dmitrievna Taratuta had three children, Vladimir, a conductor, Generalmusikdirektor of the Bavarian State Opera, Maria, a pianist and music teacher, and Dmitri, also a conductor. In 2015, Jurowski published an autobiography, covering as a gifted storyteller his meetings with great musicians.

Jurowski died on 19 March 2022, at age 76.

Recordings 
Jurowski made several first recordings, some in series such as orchestral works by Berthold Goldschmidt, and symphonies by Ture Rangström and Wilhelm Peterson-Berger. He recorded rarely performed music such as Franz Lehár's opera Tatjana, Serge Prokofiev ballet Auf dem Dnjepr, Giacomo Meyerbeer's incidental music to Struensee, and works by Aram Khachaturian, Ottorino Respighi and Franz von Suppè. He conducted Shostakvich's film scores, orchestral songs, and his cantata Stenka Rasin.

Writings

Awards 
 1992, 1996, 2017 Preis der deutschen Schallplattenkritik
 2001 Grammy nominations for three CD productions of Orchestral Music by Rimsky-Korsakov with the Rundfunk-Sinfonieorchester Berlin
 2012 International Shostakovich Prize by the Shostakovich Gohrisch Foundation

References

Further reading

External links 
* Michail Jurowski on Naxos
 Michail Jurowski on IMG Artists
 
 

1945 births
2022 deaths
Musicians from Moscow
Soviet emigrants to Germany
20th-century Russian Jews
Moscow Conservatory alumni
Soviet conductors (music)
German conductors (music)
20th-century Russian conductors (music)
21st-century Russian conductors (music)
Russian male conductors (music)
21st-century Russian male musicians
Soviet classical musicians
German classical musicians